Joseph Charles Fowell (2 August 1891 – 3 July 1970) was a prominent Australian 20th century architect.

Born in Albany, Western Australia and educated in England, Fowell returned to Australia in 1919 where he worked with Professor Leslie Wilkinson at Sydney University. In 1926 Fowell became an assistant to Henry Budden. Fowell created a number of architectural partnerships including:
 Fowell and McConnel: 1928-1939, with Kenneth McConnel
 Fowell and Mansfield: 1939-1946 with J. L. S. Mansfield 
 Fowell, Mansfield & Maclurcan: 1946-1962 with D. C. B. Maclurcan
 Fowell, Mansfield, Jarvis & Maclurcan: 1962-1970 with O. R. Jarvi

Notable works

References

Bibliography

Australian Dictionary of Biography
Father Laurie Bent, St Augustines, Yass, 2006.

External links
 Royal Australian Institute of Architects Sulman Awards
 About St Annes Church, Bondi; NSW Heritage
 About BMA House, Sydney; Australian Heritage Database
 RAIA: Significant Lost & Altered Sydney Office Buildings

1891 births
1970 deaths
Architects from Western Australia
Recipients of the Royal Australian Institute of Architects’ Gold Medal
People from Albany, Western Australia
New South Wales architects